Lathyrus inconspicuus, the inconspicuous pea, is a species of annual herb in the family Fabaceae.

Sources

References 

inconspicuus
Flora of Malta